Linquornis is a genus of peacock-sized Galliform bird that lived in Miocene of China; it consists one single species. Linquornis gigantis is the biggest bird fossil found in China.

References 

Miocene birds
Fossil taxa described in 1980